Belinda Stewart-Wilson (born 16 April 1971) is a British actress best known for her role as Polly McKenzie in The Inbetweeners.

Early life
Stewart-Wilson was born on 16 April 1971 in Kensington, the youngest of three daughters of Lieutenant-Colonel Sir Blair Stewart-Wilson, a British Army officer, and his wife, Helen Mary Fox. Stewart-Wilson grew up on military postings in the UK, Germany, and Austria before her family settled in London, her father becoming an Equerry to Queen Elizabeth II. She was educated at St Mary's School, Calne in Calne, Wiltshire and Hurst Lodge School in Berkshire, before completing a three-year degree in classical acting at the Webber Douglas Academy of Dramatic Art, in London.

Career
Stewart-Wilson's first television role was in the series Shine on Harvey Moon, a show based on 1950s London. Her next two roles were one-time appearances in the popular British sitcom Goodnight Sweetheart and playing a secretary in a TV adaptation of Agatha Christie's Poirot story The Murder on the Links.

From there Stewart-Wilson went on to play roles in British sitcoms Days Like These and Starting Out as well as Kiss Kiss, a feature film starring Chris Penn and Stellan Skarsgård.  She also played Dina in La Passione, a feature film based on the life of Chris Rea, which opened the London Film Festival in 1997.

In 2004 she made an appearance in the long-running British medical drama Holby City, before moving on to two satirical programs: making an appearance in Look Around You, which won the Rose d'Or award for best comedy, as well as in three episodes of the 24-hour news-mocking Broken News.

Throughout 2007 and 2008, Stewart-Wilson worked on a number of television shows. Her most notable credits during this time period were the roles of Victoria Reynholm, the wife of Denholm Reynholm in The IT Crowd, and Nikki in the TV series Jekyll alongside James Nesbitt and Gina Bellman. She also made an appearance in the commercially successful mockumentary feature film Razzle Dazzle: A Journey into Dance.  Belinda also played a cameo role in Stephen Poliakoff's Joe's Palace in a scene with Michael Gambon.

In 2007, Belinda played various roles in The Peter Serafinowicz Show, going on to appear in The Peter Serafinowicz Show Christmas Special in 2008 which was nominated for a Bafta for Best Comedy in 2009.  A "best of" compilation was also aired in 2008.

Between 2008 and 2010, she played Will McKenzie's mother Polly in The Inbetweeners, the multi-award-winning sitcom which was nominated for a BAFTA Award for "Best Sitcom" in 2009 and won the BAFTA audience award in 2010.  It also won most popular comedy programme at the National Television Awards in 2011. Stewart-Wilson also appears in The Inbetweeners Movie and its sequel, which were both box office successes. However, she is only 13 years older than actor Simon Bird, who played Will. She  also plays the recurring role of Christine Johnson in the third series of the cult science-fiction show Primeval.

In 2010, she once again appeared in The IT Crowd, this time playing Victoria Reynholm, the wife of Douglas (Denholm Reynholm's son, played by Matt Berry, making her the daughter-in-law of her previous character), who mysteriously vanished two weeks into their marriage whilst washing the car.

In August 2010, Irish band Pugwash announced that they would be including a song called "Dear Belinda" on their album The Olympus Sound, the track being written as a tribute to Stewart-Wilson for her 40th birthday. Pugwash frontman Thomas Walsh (also of The Duckworth Lewis Method) added that Stewart-Wilson had requested that she appear on the final version of the song.

Between 2011 and 2014, Stewart-Wilson appeared in the critically acclaimed TV film about Monty Python, Holy Flying Circus, as well as the successful period drama Ripper Street.  She also played Nancy in Robert B. Weide's Mr Sloane, alongside Nick Frost.

In 2015, Stewart-Wilson played Alison, wife of Mike, (played by Max Beesley) in 5 episodes of BBC drama, Ordinary Lies.

Stewart-Wilson appeared as American Fiona Crossley in 25 episodes of Disney's production of The Evermoor Chronicles on The Disney Channel (2014–2016).

In 2015, Stewart-Wilson appeared alongside Toby Jones, playing his wife, Alice, in a Radio Play for BBC Radio 4 called "The Len Continuum" by Peter Strickland.

In 2018, Stewart-Wilson had a recurring role in series 32 and 33 of Casualty, appearing in several episodes as Ciara Cassidy, fellow alcoholic and love interest of consultant doctor Dylan Keogh.

Personal life
Stewart-Wilson was married to actor and comedian Ben Miller, until they divorced in 2011. They have a son, Jackson (b. 2006).

Filmography
Four Weddings and a Funeral (1994), Wedding Singer
Kiss Kiss (2001)
Razzle Dazzle: A Journey into Dance (2007)
The Inbetweeners Movie (2011), Polly McKenzie
All That Way for Love (2011), Kate
The Inbetweeners 2 (2014), Polly McKenzie
The Brother (2014)

Television movies
Joe's Palace (2007)

Television appearances
Shine on Harvey Moon (1995)
Murder on the Links (1996)
Goodnight Sweetheart (1999)
Days Like These (1999)
Holby City (2004)
Look Around You (2005)
Broken News (2005)
Party Animals (2007)
Jekyll (2007)
The Peter Serafinowicz Show (2007)
The IT Crowd (2007, 2010), Barbara Reynholm, Victoria Reynholm
The Inbetweeners (2008–2010), Polly McKenzie
Primeval (2009), Christine Johnson
New Tricks (2010)
Miranda (2010)
The Impressions Show with Culshaw and Stephenson (2010)
My Family (2011)
Jack Whitehall's Little Cracker (2011), Mrs Whitehall
Citizen Khan (2013)
Ordinary Lies (2015)
Evermoor (2014–2016)
Sick Note (2017–Present), Annette Glennis
Casualty (2018), Ciara Cassidy
The Inbetweeners: Fwends Reunited, Herself, (special)
Stay Close: (2021), Sarah Green
Toast of Tinseltown (2022), Bellender Bojangles

Video games

References

External links
 

1970 births
Alumni of the Webber Douglas Academy of Dramatic Art
English television actresses
English people of Scottish descent
Living people
People educated at Hurst Lodge School
People educated at St Mary's School, Calne
Actresses from London
21st-century English actresses
20th-century English actresses
English film actresses
People from Kensington
English voice actresses